See also the 340 F1, a Formula One racer, and 340 America, a GT car

The Ferrari 340 Mexico was a Ferrari sports racing car which was intended for the 1952 Carrera Panamericana. Just 4 were made in 1952, 3 Vignale Berlinettas and 1 Vignale Spyder; all designed by Giovanni Michelotti. Mexico used a  wheelbase. Chinetti and Lucas finished the race at third place in berlinetta.

The Ferrari 340 MM was an evolution of the 340 Mexico with shorter, wheelbase. MM used the same 4.1 L Lampredi V12 with similar three Weber 40DCF carburettors that helped the 340 achieve  at 6600 rpm and a maximum speed of 282 km/h. 10 examples were made, 4 Pinin Farina Berlinettas, 2 Touring Spyders and 4 Vignale Spyders (designed by Giovanni Michelotti). A total of four were converted to 375 MM spec. Giannino Marzotto won Mille Miglia 1953 edition in Vignale spider, setting a new average speed record for the race; with other 340 MM finishing fourth. Two more 340 MMs were entered that year in Touring barchetta guise but did not finish.

References

Bibliography

External links

Ferrari 340 Mexico: Ferrari History
Ferrari 340 MM: Ferrari History

340
Sports racing cars
Mille Miglia